Alphonse Gomis (born 14 October 1965) is a Senegalese alpine skier. He competed in five events at the 1992 Winter Olympics.

References

1965 births
Living people
Senegalese male alpine skiers
Olympic alpine skiers of Senegal
Alpine skiers at the 1992 Winter Olympics
Place of birth missing (living people)